Kenneth R. "Ken" MacLeod (born December 5, 1955) is a former political figure in New Brunswick, Canada. He represented Moncton Crescent in the Legislative Assembly of New Brunswick from 1995 to 1999 as a Liberal member.

He was born in Moncton, New Brunswick, the son of Roy MacLeod and Edith Quan. MacLeod was educated at Acadia University and Mount Allison University. In 1976, he married Miriam Wilson. MacLeod was defeated when he ran for reelection in 1999.

References 
 Canadian Parliamentary Guide, 1997, Kathryn O'Handley 

1955 births
Living people
New Brunswick Liberal Association MLAs
People from Moncton